Boana goiana is a species of frog in the family Hylidae that is endemic to Brazil. Its natural habitats are moist savanna, subtropical or tropical moist shrubland, subtropical or tropical high-altitude shrubland, and rivers. It is threatened by habitat loss, though is still currently of least concern as its conservation status.

References

Boana
Endemic fauna of Brazil
Amphibians described in 1968
Taxonomy articles created by Polbot